The 1980 United States presidential election in Pennsylvania took place on November 4, 1980, and was part of the 1980 United States presidential election. Voters chose 27 representatives, or electors to the Electoral College, who voted for president and vice president.

Pennsylvania voted for the Republican nominee, Governor Ronald Reagan, over the Democratic nominee, President Jimmy Carter. Reagan won Pennsylvania by a margin of 7.11%. This result nonetheless made Pennsylvania about 2.6% more Democratic than the nation-at-large.

Primaries

Republican Primary

Democratic Primary

Results

Results by county

See also
 List of United States presidential elections in Pennsylvania

References

Pennsylvania
1980
1980 Pennsylvania elections